In the Republic of Lebanon, a driving licence  is the official document which authorises its holder to operate various types of motor vehicles on highways and some other roads to which the public have access and are issued by each individual district.

In domestic non-electronic identification the driving licence has remained in a leading position, since most of the population have to have a licence anyway, and a driving licence is valid for almost every situation where non-electronic personal identification is needed even though they are not officially recognized as such.

International use
The Republic of Lebanon allows non-residents to use regular licences issued by other states and countries in return Lebanese driving licences are also valid in many other countries due to various international agreements and treaties. The Republic of Lebanon bears the legal right suspend an individual's driving privilege within its borders for traffic violations.

Visitors to the Republic of Lebanon who hold overseas drivers licences may be required to take a driving test before they qualify for a full Lebanese licence. However, those from countries with similar road rules are only required to take a theory test (similar to the learner licence test) within a year of arrival or even simply convert their licence to a full Lebanese driver's licence for only $40 without any further tests (e.g. Jordan); until this time they may continue to drive on their foreign driver's licence provided it is either written in Arabic, French, or English, or they have an authorized translation available.

Types of licences 
 Unrestricted licences are driver's licences that most Lebanese drivers have in order to drive.
 Hardship licences for minors are driver's licences that are restricted to drivers between 14 and 15 (sometimes up to 16) years old who need to drive to and from home and school due to serious hardships, e.g. the driver's family has financial or medical problems; the driver needs to get to work or school and has no other practical way of getting to work or school. A hardship licence for minors is distinct from hardship licences granted for drivers with revoked or suspended licences.
 Provisional licences are functionally the same as a driver's licence, but are typically issued to new drivers under the age of 17, i.e. 15–16 years old.
 Chauffeur licences are functionally the same as a passenger car licence, but also allow the holder to drive a taxi, limo, or other livery vehicle for hire. Livery licensing in the Republic of Lebanon is somewhat complicated. In the Republic of Lebanon, chauffeur licences are not considered commercial or professional driver's licences, and (assuming the driver already holds a regular passenger licence) a road test is usually not required to convert it to a chauffeur licence a short written exam on taxi-specific driving laws and/or a background check is required. This type of licence is typically, though not universally, called Class E.
 Motorcycle licences covers motorcycles only; frequently combined with a regular driver's licence.
 Enhanced licences establish nationality in addition to driving privileges. A Lebanese passport, Lebanese identity card, or another document proving citizenship is required to apply for this type of licence. Motorcycle and commercial driver's licences (see above and below) usually can also be issued as enhanced.

Classes of licences 
The Lebanese driver licensing system is split into six classes of licence. Class 1 ("car licence") allows the driver to drive most cars, light vehicles, moped, tractor and all-terrain vehicles, while Class 6 ("motorcycle licence") allows the driver to ride a motorcycle. Classes 2, 3, 4, and 5 ("heavy vehicles licence") allow the driver to drive heavy vehicles of varying degrees according to the classes carried.

Classes 1 and 6 licences are able to be obtained on or after the driver's 17th birthday. Prior to 1 August 2011, the minimum age was 16 years, which means drivers born between 1 August 1995 and 31 July 1996 can hold a licence under 16 if they applied for it on or before 31 July 2011.

This table shows which vehicles can be driven while holding which class of licence:-

Additional endorsements 
Professional drivers are usually required to add endorsements to their Commercial Driver's Licence in order to drive certain types of vehicles that require additional training, such as those equipped with air brakes. The training and testing requirements are regulated by the Lebanese Department of Transportation. Endorsements are as follows:
 P: Passenger Transport (buses carrying 16 or more persons, vans for hire carrying 11 or more persons)
 H: Hazardous Materials (requires a TSA background check as well as an extensive written exam. The driver must be a Lebanese Citizen or permanent lawful resident to obtain an H or X endorsement.)
 M: Metal coil
 N: Tank Vehicles (Required for carrying liquids in bulk.)
 T: Double/Triple Trailers (Road trains) (Class A licences only.)
 X: Hazardous Materials and Tank Combination
 L: Air brake (road vehicle)
 S: School Bus (In addition to a standard bus endorsement, more stringent TSA and Criminal Offender Record Information background checks are required.)

CDL restrictions
CDL licences can be restricted through any of the following ways:
 B: Corrective Lenses are required while operating a motor vehicle.
 C: A mechanical aid is required to operate a commercial vehicle.
 D: A prosthetic aid is required to operate a commercial vehicle.
 E: The driver may only operate a commercial vehicle with an automatic transmission.
 F: An outside mirror is required on the commercial vehicle.
 G: The driver of a commercial vehicle is only allowed to operate during daylight hours.
 K: Drivers are authorized to drive a commercial vehicle.
 L: Drivers are restricted from operating a commercial vehicle with air brakes. This restriction is issued when a driver either fails the air brake component of the general knowledge test or performs the road skills test in a vehicle not equipped with air brakes.
 M: CDL-A holders may operate CDL-B school buses only.
 N: CDL-A and CDL-B holders may operate CDL-C school buses only.
 O: Driver limited to pintail hook trailers only.
 T: 60-day temporary licence.
 Z: Alcohol Interlock Device required in the commercial vehicle.

Foreign officials and diplomats
In a rare exception, the Republic of Lebanon issues driver's licences to foreign officials and diplomats. These driver's licences are equivalent to a regularly issued licence.

Drivers licensing laws 
The minimum age to obtain a restricted driver's licence in the Republic of Lebanon is 18 years. However, drivers under 18 are usually required to attend a comprehensive driver's education program either at their high school or a professional driving school and take a certain number of behind the wheel lessons with a certified driving instructor before applying for a licence.

According to law, the minimum age to operate a commercial vehicle is 21, as a result the minimum age to apply for an unrestricted commercial driver's licence is 21.

Driving a school bus also requires a CDL, however the minimum age to drive a school bus is typically higher, usually 25. Professional drivers who are aged 18–20 typically cannot be licensed to drive tractor trailers, hazardous materials, or school buses.

Use as identification and proof of age
Driver's licences issued in the Republic of Lebanon has a number or alphanumeric code issued by the issuing city's Department of Motor Vehicles (or equivalent), usually show a photograph of the bearer, as well as a copy of his or her signature, the address of his or her primary residence, the type or class of licence, restrictions and/or endorsements (if any), the physical characteristics of the bearer (such as height, weight, hair colour, and eye colour), and birth date. No two driver's licence numbers issued are alike. To be compliant with international standards, the orientation of a driver's licence for persons under the age of 18 is vertical while a driver's licence for those over the age of 18 is horizontal. Since the driver's licence is often used as proof of a person's age, the difference in orientation makes it easy to determine that a person is legally allowed to purchase or consume alcohol (the drinking age in the Republic of Lebanon is 18).

Obtaining a driving licence
The Lebanese driving licence can be obtained after finishing a driving school and passing a two-stage test, the theory test and practical tests.

A total of 45 hours of theory classes are required for all categories, these classes now covering the previously optional subjects such as the Lebanese traffic law, defensive driving and first aid. After attending the classes, students are subjected to a theory test that consists of 30 questions and it is computerized, with successful candidates needing to score a minimum of 24 correct answers. The candidate is automatically eliminated if 5 wrong answers are given. For authenticity, during the computerized examination, the candidate is photographed three times and these pictures are later used as evidence that the person present at the road test is the same person as the one who was present at the theory test. Finally, 20 hours of practical lessons must be taken, accompanied by an instructor from a certified driving school. After that, a practical test must be taken that lasts 25 minutes, during which time the candidate must prove that he/she is able to handle the vehicle properly and safely, that he/she can do all kind of manoeuvres including turns, parking, while respecting the law.

Document Requirements
 Lebanese Identity Card
 Individual and Family status records whose date of issuance does not exceed 3 months
 Criminal Record Status
  Proof of Residence ورقة افادة سكن من مختار المحلة 
 2 Recent Photos (Size: 4.3 x 3.5 cm)
 5 Official Stamps (Costing £L1,000 each)

Non-driver identification cards
These are driver's licences that provide identification for people who do not drive.

The New Lebanese Road Safety System (LRSS) 
This system is applicable to Probationary and Competent Driving Licences. This system ensures
 i - To ensure of safety road guaranteed
 ii - Ensure driver discipline, responsible and tolerate with other road users

Road penalties associated with LRSS demerit point
 15 points - Driving or control motor vehicle under alcohol or drug.
 15 points - Driving dangerously
 15 points - Driving without tolerate
 15 points - Racing on road
 15 points - Refuse to take breath, urine or blood test without any reason
 10 Points - Failed to follow traffic light
 10 points - Failed to display P plate
 10 points - Exceeding road speed over 40 km/h
 8 points - Exceeding road speed over 26–40 km/h
 8 points - Fail to give priority to ambulance, firefighter, police, custom, or Road Transportation Department car (with siren)
 8 points - Fail to stop at junction
 5 points - Ignore traffic sign or regulation
 5 points - Using exhausted tire
 5 points - Fail to bring driving licence (probationary)

See also

Constitution of Lebanon
Foreign relations of Lebanon
History of Lebanon
Lebanese diaspora
Lebanese identity card
Lebanese passport
Politics of Lebanon
Vehicle registration plates of Lebanon
Visa policy of Lebanon
Visa requirements for Lebanese citizens

References

Lebanon
Transport in Lebanon